The Dutch name Waardenburg may refer to:
 Waardenburg, a town in the municipality of Neerijnen, province of Gelderland
 Waardenburg Castle, a fortification in the Dutch municipality of Neerijnen
 Waardenburg syndrome, a genetic disorder
 Petrus Johannes Waardenburg (1886–1979), a Dutch ophthalmologist and geneticist
 Dokter Faust van Waardenburg, a Dutch folklore character 
 Stephan Lucien Joseph van Waardenburg, first governor of Dutch New Guinea